GEIA or Geia may refer to:

 Ge'a, a moshav in Israel
 Global Emissions InitiAtive 
 Government Electronics and Information Technology Association